Estonians in Finland or Finnish Estonians are people with an ethnic Estonian background residing in Finland. In 2017, there were 52,424 Estonian immigrants in Finland, according to the UN. Estonians are Finland's second largest immigrant group, after Russians.

Estonians have for a long time helped the workforce in Finland, especially in the capital region. Over 35,000 of them reside in Uusimaa.

History 
Immigration from Estonia to Finland was low before 1990. After the collapse of the Soviet Union, and Estonia's EU membership in 2004, emigration from Estonia to Finland increased rapidly.

The peak migration of Estonians was in 2012, when over 6,000 Estonians emigrated to Finland. In 2017 however the net migration from Estonia was negative, as Estonians are returning to their country. Reasons for this are better salaries in Estonia and family ties. In spite of this the Estonian population is still growing, although at a much slower rate than previously.

Employment 
The employment rate of Estonians is 76%, higher than Finns.

Population 
In 2017, there were 49,590 speakers of Estonian. Finland has the largest community of Estonians outside Estonia In 2012, 5,000 more people from Estonia emigrated to Finland than immigrated to Estonia. There are an estimated 100,000 Estonians working in Finland.

Notable Estonians in Finland

 Hans Kalm, soldier
 Hella Wuolijoki, writer
 Imbi Paju, journalist, writer and filmmaker
 Kalevi Kotkas, athlete
 Mikael Gabriel, rapper
 Mäkki, rapper
 Siim Liivik, ice hockey player
 Sofi Oksanen, writer
 Tiina Lillak, athlete

See also 
 Estonia–Finland relations

References

Ethnic groups in Finland
Estonia–Finland relations